Holy Week is a religious celebration in Christianity.

Holy Week may also refer to:
Holy Week (album), a 2005 album by Duke Garwood
Holy Week (film), a 1995 Polish film

See also
La Semaine Sainte, a 1953 novel by Louis Aragon
Semana santa, a 2002 thriller film
Semana Santa (2015 film), a Mexican drama film